The FISU World University Championships are part of the sporting events of the International University Sports Federation. Launched the FISU World University Championships in 1963, with Lund, Sweden hosting the Handball event.

Championships
In the year of the Universiade, the Championships shall be the same as the World Games tournament. The programme of the World University Championships is subject to change and currently includes 37 sports.
In order to be as complete as possible, it includes:
 Individual/ team sports
 Indoor/ outdoor sports
 Combat sports
 Mind sports
 Summer/ Winter sports.

Judo
Previous Events

    2009 - 25th Summer Universiade – Belgrade (SRB)
    2007 - 24th Summer Universiade – Bangkok (THA)
    2006 - 18th WUC Judo – Suwon (KOR)
    2005 - 23rd Summer Universiade – Izmir (TUR)
    2004 - 17th WUC Judo – Moscow (RUS)
    2003 - 22nd Summer Universiade – Daegu (KOR)
    2002 - 16th WUC Judo – Novi Sad (SCG)
    2001 - 21st Summer Universiade – Beijing (CHN)
    2000 - 15th WUC Judo – Malaga (ESP)
    1999 - 20th Summer Universiade – Palma de Mallorca (ESP)
    1998 - 14th WUC Judo – Prague (CZE)
    1996 - 13th WUC Judo – Jonquière (CAN)
    1995 - 18th Summer Universiade – Fukuoka (JPN)
    1994 - 12th WUC Judo – Münster (GER)
    1990 - 11th WUC Judo – Brussels (BEL)
    1988 - 10th WUC Judo – Tbilissi (URS)
    1987 - 9th WUC Judo – Sao Paulo (BRA)
    1985 - 13th Summer Universiade – Kobe (JPN)
    1984 - 8th WUC Judo – Strasbourg (FRA)
    1982 - 7th WUC Judo – Jyvaskyla (FIN)
    1980 - 6th WUC Judo – Wroclaw (POL)
    1978 - 5th WUC Judo – Rio de Janeiro (BRA)
    1974 - 4th WUC Judo – Brussels (BEL)
    1972 - 3rd WUC Judo – London (GBR)
    1968 - 2nd WUC Judo – Lisboa (POR)
    1967 - 5th Summer Universiade – Tokyo (JPN)
    1966 - 1st WUC Judo – Prague (TCH)

2022

 FISU World University Championship Ski Orienteering Place: Jachymov, CZECH REPUBLIC 22–26 February 2022
 FISU World University Championship Speed Skating Place: Lake Placid, UNITED STATES OF AMERICA 2–5 March 2022
 FISU World University Championship Cross Country Place: Aveiro, PORTUGAL 12 March 2022
 FISU University World Cup Finswimming Place: Lignano Sabbiadoro, ITALY 1–2 April 2022
 FISU World University Championship Sport Climbing Place: Innsbruck, AUSTRIA 14–17 June 2022
 FISU University World Cup Floorball Place: Liberec, CZECH REPUBLIC 20–24 June 2022
 FISU University World Cup Handball Place: Pristina, KOSOVO 11–17 July 2022
 FISU World University Championship Futsal Place: Braga-Guimaraes, PORTUGAL 18–24 July 2022
 FISU World University Championship Golf Place: Torino, ITALY 20–23 July 2022
 FISU World University Championship Orienteering Place: Magglingen – Biel/Bienne, SWITZERLAND 17–21 August 2022
 FISU World University Championship Beach Volleyball Place: Lake Placid, UNITED STATES OF AMERICA 24–28 August 2022
 FISU World University Championship Triathlon Place: Maceio, BRAZIL 10–11 September 2022
 FISU World University Championship Mind Sports Place: Antwerp, BELGIUM 12–17 September 2022
 FISU World University Championship Canoe Sprint Place: Bydgoszcz, POLAND 16–18 September 2022
 FISU World University Championship Modern Pentathlon Place: Buenos Aires, ARGENTINA 21–25 September 2022
 FISU University World Cup Combat Sports 29 September -8 October 2022 Place : Moved from Russia to TBD
 FISU University World Cup 3x3 Basketball Place: Xiamen, CHINA (PEOPLE'S REPUBLIC OF) 20–23 October 2022
 FISU University World Cup Cheerleading Place: Heraklion (Creta), GREECE 4–6 November 2022
 FISU World University Championship Squash Place: New Giza, EGYPT 7–13 November 2022 5–9 December 2022

Others
 2022 FISU Volunteer Leaders Academy (Online) 17 June 2022
 International Day of University Sport (IDUS) 2022 IDUS 2022 20 September 2022
 FISU World Forum 2022 Place: Cartago, COSTA RICA

Cancelled
 FISU University World Cup American Football Place: Monterrey, MEXICO Cancelled
 FISU University World Cup Powerlifting Place: 25–29 July 2022 CANCELLED 
 FISU World University Championship Waterski & Wakeboard Place: 24–27 August 2022 CANCELLED

2023
 FISU Word University Championship Rowing Place: London Ontario, CANADA 13–15 July 2023

2024

 Beach Volleyball Maceió (BRA)
 Cross Country Muscat (OMA)
 Cycling Cartago (CRC)
 Futsal San Juan (ARG)
 Golf Seinäjoki (FIN)
 Mind Sports Kampala (UGA)
 Orienteering Bansko (BUL)
 Rowing Rotterdam (NED)
 Weightlifting
 Waterski and Wakeboard Dnipro (UKR)
 Triathlon Gdansk (POL)
 Squash Cape Town (RSA)
 Sport Climbing Koper (SLO)
 Shooting Sport New Delhi (IND)

World Cup
Source:

 FISU University (with Qualifying Tournaments) from 2015
 FISU University 3x3 Basketball World Cup (with Qualifying Tournaments) from 2019
 FISU University Rugby Sevens World Cup (with Qualifying Tournaments) from 2022
 FISU University Handball World Cup from 2022
 FISU University Floorball World Cup from 2022
 FISU University American Football World Cup from 2022
 FISU University Combat Sports World Cup from 2022 (six sports: Boxing, Karate, Muaythai, Sambo, Wrestling, Wushu)
 FISU University Finswimming World Cup from 2022
 FISU University Cheerleading World Cup from 2022
 FISU University Powerlifting World Cup from 2021

See also
 Universiade
 Gymnasiade
 World School Championships
 World Military Championships
 European Universities Championships

References

External links
 FISU World University Championships website

 
Student sports competitions